The 12381 / 12382 Poorva Express is a Superfast train belonging to Eastern Railway zone that runs between Howrah Junction and New Delhi in India. It is currently being operated with 12381/12382 train numbers on a tri-weekly basis.

History 
Before the introduction of Rajdhani Express in 1969, Indian Railway use to run a series of train called as Deluxe Express. One Deluxe Express use to run between Amristar and Bombay and other between Amritsar and Howrah. Both of these trains were fully Air Conditioned trains and the passengers were provided elegant services. Later on with the introduction of trains like Howrah Rajdhani Express and Udyan Abha Toofan Express, this train slowly lost its grandeur and popularity. Later on, in order to make this train more affordable to passengers further classes were added in this train, hence relegating it from fully air conditioned train to partial one. And later on with further standardization it was relegated to standard blue ICF coach. But though it lost its grandeur, but its popularity never ceased. Due to its high popularity, a separate service was started from New Delhi to Howrah via Patna on 1 August 1971.

Incidentally Poorva Express is the first train among the non-Rajdhani/Duronto class to be upgraded to LHB coach. It was upgraded to LHB coach on 30 April 2013.

Service

The 12381 Poorva Express has an average speed of 66.62 km/hr with halt and covers 1449 km in 21h 45m. The 12382 Poorva Express has an average speed of 62.2 km/hr with halt and covers 1449 km in 23h 20m.

Route & Halts 

All 20 halts of the train are:

Coach composite and Traction

The train has standard LHB rakes with max speed of 130 kmph. The train consists of 22 coaches :

 1 First AC and AC II Tier Combined as HA1
 2 AC II Tier
 5 AC III Tier
 9 Sleeper Coaches
 1 Pantry Car
 2 General Unreserved
 2 End-on Generator
This train is hauled by Howrah or Ghaziabad based WAP7 in both directions.

Accident 
The 12381 Howrah - New Delhi Poorva Express via Gaya, which left from Howrah on 19 April 2019 got derailed at Ruma Railway Station, near Kanpur in Uttar Pradesh. At least 15 people were injured in this accident. As per PRO Kanpur Division, due to the modern LHB coach, something serious didn't happen. Commissioner of Railway Safety (CRS) of Indian Railways ordered a panel for enquiry in this accident.

Notes

See also 

 New Delhi railway station
 Howrah Junction railway station
 Poorva Express

References

External links 

 12381/Poorva Express (via Gaya)
 12382/Poorva Express (via Gaya)
 Poorva Express/12381
 Poorva Express/12382

Rail transport in Howrah
Rail transport in Jharkhand
Rail transport in Bihar
Rail transport in Uttar Pradesh
Delhi–Kolkata trains
Railway services introduced in 1951
Express trains in India
Named passenger trains of India